Duyên Hải is a rural district (huyện) of Trà Vinh province in the Mekong Delta region of Vietnam. As of 2015 the district had a population of 82,393. The district covers an area of 300.47 km². The district capital lies at Long Thành town. The town of Duyên Hải was separated from the district in 2015.

References

Districts of Trà Vinh province